Roger Veyron (born 15 June 1933) is a French basketball player. He competed in the men's tournament at the 1956 Summer Olympics.

References

1933 births
Living people
French men's basketball players
Olympic basketball players of France
Basketball players at the 1956 Summer Olympics
Place of birth missing (living people)